Elder or Élder is a masculine given name which may refer to:

 Élder (footballer) (born 1976), Brazilian former footballer Élder Alencar Machado de Campos
 Elder José Figueroa (born 1980), Colombian-born Salvadorian footballer 
 Élder Granja (born 1982), Brazilian footballer
 Elder Herrera (born 1968), Colombian retired road cyclist
 Elder Olson (1909–1992), American poet, teacher and literary critic
 Elder Vogel, Jr., American politician
 Elder White (1933-2010), Major League Baseball player in part of the 1962 season

Masculine given names